Concordia Subglacial Lake is a subglacial lake located beneath an ice sheet  thick. It was first located in December 1999; the name derives from the nearby French-Italian Concordia Research Station.

References
 

Lakes of Antarctica
Bodies of water of Wilkes Land